is a former Japanese football player.

Club statistics

References

External links

1983 births
Living people
Association football people from Yamaguchi Prefecture
Japanese footballers
J1 League players
J2 League players
JEF United Chiba players
Tochigi SC players
Association football midfielders